Shunji Kasuya (born 24 January 1962) is a Japanese former racing driver.

Racing record

24 Hours of Le Mans results

References

1962 births
Living people
Japanese racing drivers
Japanese Formula 3000 Championship drivers
Japanese Touring Car Championship drivers
24 Hours of Le Mans drivers
World Sportscar Championship drivers

Nismo drivers
TOM'S drivers
20th-century Japanese people